Parliamentary elections were held in the Seychelles in June 1957. The Seychelles Taxpayers and Producers Association (STPA) won three of the four seats.

Electoral system
The 13-member Legislative Council consisted of the Governor, six officials (the Government Secretary, the Attorney General, the Treasurer and the Directors of Agriculture, Education and Medical Services), two appointed members and four elected members, elected from single-member constituencies.

The right to vote was granted to all citizens over the age of 21 who could write their name, paid income tax on an annual income of SR 3,000 or more, and could prove that they had lived in the Seychelles for at least a year. Only around 10% of the population were able to register.

Campaign
In two of the four seats, STPA candidates were unopposed; Helen Stevenson-Delhomme in North Mahé and Harry Savy in Praslin and La Digue.

Results
Voter turnout in the contested seats was 59%.

Aftermath
Following the elections, D Bailey and E Stravens were appointed to the Council.

References

Seychelles
Elections in Seychelles
1957 in Seychelles
Election and referendum articles with incomplete results